Basil Richards (born ) is a former professional English rugby league footballer who played in the 1980s, 1990s and 2000s, and coached in the 2000s and 2010s.

Background
Basil Richards was born in Bradford, West Riding of Yorkshire, England.

Playing career
Basil Richards signed for Warrington as a junior, he made his début for Warrington on Sunday 8 January 1989, and he played his last match for Warrington on Sunday 25 April 1993, and played 42 matches. He signed with Huddersfield for the 1993-94 season, and remained with the club until 1999, playing in 1998's Super League III, and 1999's IV.

Richards later played for Doncaster.

Coaching career
After retirement Richards worked for the Kirklees Council as part of their sports development team and took up coaching, working part-time with the Bradford Bulls, and as coach of Queensbury ARLFC. He also worked with English national youth sides.

He was appointed Bradford Bull's assistant coach in 2006 by Steve McNamara. Richards coached the Bradford Bulls Senior Academy side. He was released by the club in early 2010 after Bradford suffered poor form.

Personal life
His brother, Craig Richards, played for the Bradford Bulls. His cousin, Dean Richards, played football for Bradford City.

References

1965 births
Living people
Black British sportspeople
Doncaster R.L.F.C. players
English rugby league coaches
English rugby league players
Huddersfield Giants players
Rugby league players from Bradford
Rugby league props
Rugby league second-rows
Warrington Wolves players